St. Athanasius Episcopal Church and Parish House and the Church of the Holy Comforter is a historic Episcopal church complex located at 300 E. Webb Avenue and 320 E. Davis Street in Burlington, Alamance County, North Carolina.

Description and history
St. Athanasius Church is a small Carpenter Gothic chapel designed by Johannes Adam Simon Oertel and built in 1879–1880. Adjacent to St. Athanasius is the Parish House (1887).  In 1911, the Neo-Gothic Revival style Church of the Holy Comforter was designed by Hobart Upjohn and built west of St. Athanasius.  The Neo-Gothic Revival style Parish House was added in 1926. The Parish House addition and Great Hall were added in 1963.  Between St Athanasius Church and Church of the Holy Comforter is a cemetery with graves dating to 1882.

It was added to the National Register of Historic Places in 1979.

References

Churches in Burlington, North Carolina
Episcopal church buildings in North Carolina
Houses in Alamance County, North Carolina
Churches on the National Register of Historic Places in North Carolina
Gothic Revival church buildings in North Carolina
Churches completed in 1880
19th-century Episcopal church buildings
National Register of Historic Places in Alamance County, North Carolina